The men's featherweight (57 kg/125.4 lbs) Full-Contact category at the W.A.K.O. European Championships 2004 in Budva was the third lightest of the male Full-Contact tournaments and involved seven fighters.  Each of the matches was three rounds of two minutes each and were fought under Full-Contact kickboxing rules.

Due to there not being enough participants for a tournament of eight, one of the contestants got a bye through to the semi finals.  By the end of the championships Frenchman Lucien Gross was the gold medallist defeating Russian Boris Klimenko in the final by unanimous decision.  Defeated semi finalists Maurycy Gojko from Poland and Damir Dorts from Belarus were given bronze medals for their efforts.

Results

Key

See also
List of WAKO Amateur European Championships
List of WAKO Amateur World Championships
List of male kickboxers

References

External links
 WAKO World Association of Kickboxing Organizations Official Site

W.A.K.O. European Championships 2004 (Budva)